Lectionary 648 designated by sigla ℓ 648 (in the Gregory-Aland numbering), 
is a Greek minuscule manuscript of the New Testament, written on 232 paper leaves (22.5 cm by 15.3 cm). Paleografically it had been assigned to the 16th century.

Description 

The codex contains Lessons from the four Gospels lectionary (Evangelistarium). Written in two columns per page, in 20 lines per page.

History 

Formerly it was held at Dionysiou Monastery (307) in Athos. 

Currently the codex is housed in the Kenneth Willis Clark Collection of the Duke University (Gk MS 28) at Durham.

See also 

 List of New Testament lectionaries
 Biblical manuscripts
 Textual criticism

References

External links 
 Lectionary 648 at the Kenneth Willis Clark Collection of Greek Manuscripts

Greek New Testament lectionaries
16th-century biblical manuscripts
Athos manuscripts
Duke University Libraries
Dionysiou Monastery